Harue Yamashita (9 August 1901 – 19 March 1985) was a Japanese politician. She was one of the first group of women elected to the House of Representatives in 1946.

Biography
Yamashita was born in Hagi in 1901. She married Etsuzo Yamashita and became manager of his Fuji Asbestos Industry company after he became ill. During World War II she was evacuated to the village of Bohata after the factory was destroyed.

After the war, Yamashita joined the Japan Progressive Party. She was a candidate for the party in Fukushima in the 1946 general elections (the first in which women could vote), and was elected to the House of Representatives. The following year the JPP merged into the Democratic Party. She was re-elected as a Democratic Party in the 1947 elections. In December 1948 Finance Minister  was forced to resign after attempting to kiss Yamashita and Toshiko Matsuo. She subsequently lost her seat in the January 1949 elections.

Yamashita then joined the Kaishintō party and was elected back to the House of Representatives in 1952. She was subsequently re-elected in 1953. After joining the Shintō Dōshikai, she was re-elected again in 1955, after which she became a member of the Liberal Democratic Party. She was re-elected in 1958, serving until the 1960 elections. In 1962 she was elected to the House of Councillors. Re-elected in 1968, she served until 1974.

Yamashita was awarded the Order of the Sacred Treasure in 1971. She died in 1985.

References

1901 births
Japanese schoolteachers
Japanese journalists
Members of the House of Representatives (Japan)
Japan Progressive Party politicians
Democratic Party (Japan, 1947) politicians
Liberal Democratic Party (Japan) politicians
Members of the House of Councillors (Japan)
Recipients of the Order of the Sacred Treasure
1985 deaths
20th-century Japanese politicians
20th-century Japanese women politicians